Frederick Cole (4 October 1852 – 1 July 1941) was an English cricketer. He played for Gloucestershire between 1879 and 1890.

References

1852 births
1941 deaths
English cricketers
Gloucestershire cricketers
Cricketers from Salford